The 1975 Texas Lutheran Bulldogs football team was an American football team that represented Texas Lutheran College (later renamed Texas Lutheran University) and won the national championship during the 1975 NAIA Division II football season. In their fifth and final season under head coach Jim Wacker, the Bulldogs compiled an 11–1 record and outscored opponents by a total of 361 to 113. The team's only loss was to Howard Payne. It was the second of two consecutive national championships for Texas Lutheran.

The team played its home games at Matador Stadium in Seguin, Texas.

Schedule

References

Texas Lutheran Bulldogs
Texas Lutheran Bulldogs football seasons
NAIA Football National Champions
Texas Lutheran Bulldogs football